Ostroumov (Russian: Остроумов; from ostryi um, meaning sharp intellect) is a Russian masculine surname, its feminine counterpart is Ostroumova. The surname may refer to the following notable people:
Anna Ostroumova-Lebedeva (1871—1955), Russian artist 
Nikolai Ostroumov (1846–1930), Russian educationalist in Turkestan
Olga Ostroumova (born 1947), Russian theater and film actress

Russian-language surnames